Ornithogalum broteroi, a species of the genus Ornithogalum, is a perennial bulbous flowering plant in the asparagus family (Asparagaceae). It is classed in the Cathissa group of the genus. It bears white flowers and usually a single leaf. It is found in open woods and pastures in the western part of the Iberian Peninsula and also Morocco.

Description 

Ornithogalum broteroi shares a number of features with the other two members of the Cathissa group, namely spicate to subspicate (spiked) inflorescences and corolla segments that lack conspicuous green stripes on the reverse surface.

O. broteroi is characterised by scapes that have a single leaf, which are usually single but occasionally two–three. The plant arises from a bulb, that is about 8–12 mm in diametre, and reaches a height of 2–10 cm, occasionally up to 25 cm.

The leaves, which are 5–15 cm in length and 2–6.5 mm wide, are lanceolate and glabrous with a wide sheath at the base, then tapering to an appendage that is cuspidate and cylindrical and nearly as long as the leaf blade. The short pedicels are 1.5–3 mm (but may be up to 4 mm) long, while the much longer bracts are 8–10 mm long. The inflorescence typically has 3-5 (sometimes 8) flowers, and has perianth segments that are 10–16 mm long and white. The ovary, which is rounded at the apex (obovate-lanceolate to obtusely truncate apex) is up to two times longer than it is wide, and the style is longer than it. The fruit is a capsule, oblong to ovoid in shape. The seeds, which are 1.6–1.9 mm long are subglobose, with one pointed edge, and have a seed coat that is made up of numerous irregular pieces delimited by ridges.

Chromosome number: 2n=34

Taxonomy 

Ornithogalum broteroi has a complicated history. Known at least, to Theophrastus and Clusius, the species was first formally described by Carl Linnaeus in 1753, as Scilla unifolium, one of eight Scilla species. This was his name for a plant from Portugal previously known as Bulbus monophphyllus, flore albo. Subsequently (1799) Link reclassified it in the related genus Ornithogalum, as O. unifolium, which was an illegitimate combination. It was fully described and illustrated under that name in 1806 by Ker Gawler (two specimens) in Sims' Botanical Magazine, and it is still referred to by that name in some texts. The Portuguese botanist Félix de Avelar Brotero had also renamed it as O. nanum, but this too was shown to be illegitimate, there being pre-existing homonyms for both, and also the alternative O. spicatum Planellas. the only legitimate name is Ornithogalum broteroi, proposed by M. Lainz in 1971, and consequently bears his name as the botanical authority.

The infrageneric relationships (and hence the phylogeny) of Ornithogalum has been controversial. Briefly The sensu stricto classification of  reduces the number of species to 50 as originally proposed by Speta. Under the sensu stricto construction, O. broteroi and two other species (O. concinnum Salisb. and O. reverchonii Lange) are segregated to a separate genus, Cathissa Salisb. and is designated Cathissa broteroi (M.Laínz) Speta . Under the sensu lato constructiion Cathissa is treated as a subgenus of Ornithogalum (subg. Cathissa (Salisb.) Baker.

Etymology 

The specific epithet broteroi recognises the contribution of Félix de Avelar Brotero.

Distribution and habitat 

Littoral areas of the Western Iberian Peninsula, from northern Cabo de Finisterre, and along the coast of Portugal to Gibralter and in some parts inland to the Spanish border and northwestern Morocco to Marrakech. It is found in open woods and pastures.

Ecology 

Flowering time is February to March.

References

Bibliography

Books 
 
 
 
 , see also Species Plantarum

Articles

Websites

External links 

broteroi